J. Gordon Edwards (1867–1925) was a Canadian American film director, screenwriter, and producer of the silent era. His oeuvre consists of over fifty feature films made between 1914 and 1924. He is perhaps best known for directing twenty-four films starring vamp actress Theda Bara—including Cleopatra, her most famous role— and also the 1921 epic The Queen of Sheba. Edwards was born in Montreal and educated at a military academy with the expectation that he would pursue a career as a British Army officer. He decided against a life in the military in favor of a future in theater. At the time, the Canadian theater and film industry was limited primarily to repertory theatre, so Edwards became one of many to emigrate to the United States to work in the field. He had a short career as an actor before becoming a stage director. By 1910, he was working for American motion picture producer William Fox, who sent him to Europe to study film production.

In 1914, the Balboa Amusement Producing Company produced the drama St. Elmo. Balboa was not a film distributor, and had a standing agreement to sell its films to Fox's Box Office Attractions Company for distribution. Some modern writers credit this film as Edwards's directorial debut. However, contemporary sources named Bertram Bracken in that role, as does the American Film Institute. Aubrey Solomon's history of the Fox Film Corporation states Bracken "reportedly" directed. Regardless of Edwards's role in St. Elmo, he was chosen to direct Life's Shop Window (1914), Box Office Attractions' first film as a production company rather than merely a distributor.

The following year, the Box Office Attractions name was replaced with the newly incorporated Fox Film Corporation. Edwards remained one of the studio's most important directors and one of William Fox's closest advisers. He became known for his epic filmmaking and for a permissive approach to directing his starring cast, an attitude that led Bara's biographer to compare him to Alfred Hitchcock. Often, that cast included Bara, whose films with him include Under Two Flags (1916), the epic historical drama Cleopatra (1917), and A Woman There Was (1919).

Despite his influential role in the early days of Fox Films, the financial success of many of his movies, and public recognition of his talent as his director—compared by one contemporary reviewer to D. W. Griffith—Edwards is now mostly forgotten. Nearly all of his work is lost, including all of the titles he was best known for. Film historian Kevin Brownlow described him as a "lost name of film history". Essentially all of his films (other than a few low quality prints) for Fox Studios were lost in the 1937 Fox vault fire, which claimed 75% of all Fox films made before 1930.
Film director Blake Edwards, stated in his commentary for the Pink Panther (1963) DVD, "My grandfather was a very prominent filmmaker. I don't know an awful lot about him, other than that he was a very important filmmaker, and that most of his films... all of his films, really, were destroyed in the Long Island fire. And he was considered one of the top directors of his time."

Filmography
J. Gordon Edwards directed all films except where otherwise noted.

Balboa Amusement Producing Company (1914)

Box Office Attractions Company (1914)

Fox Film Corporation (1915–24)

Notes

References

Bibliography

External links

 

Edwards, J Gordon
J. Gordon Edwards